Milo Bloom is a fictional character in the American comic strip Bloom County. He was originally the main character, but was soon overshadowed by his best friend Michael Binkley and later on by Opus the penguin.

In Bloom County

Milo is the most worldly and cynical of all the characters; he is seemingly the only county resident who cares about politics and goings-on in the world outside his small town. He lives in the Bloom County Boarding House with his grandparents, Major Bloom and Bess Bloom. Said grandparents run the boarding house where most of the characters live. To amuse himself when alone, Milo likes to do things like going spear fishing at a small creek with a whale harpoon.

Milo is also a reporter for the Bloom Beacon and later the Bloom Picayune, where he engages in controversial reporting (he says he graduated from the "Rupert Murdoch School of Exuberant Journalism"). In early strips, he regularly bothers Senator Bedfellow with ridiculous questions, asking for confirming accusations (usually about the disappearance of Jimmy Hoffa), and attempting to convict him for virtually anything, although Bedfellow is not his only target. A noteworthy scandal he creates (with some help from Oliver Wendell Jones) involved changing the front page article of the New York Times, from "Reagan Calls Women 'America's Most Valuable Resource'" to "Reagan Calls Women 'America's Little Dumplins'", resulting in an attack on the White House by angry feminists but earning praise from Phyllis Schlafly. He has also changed the headline of the Russian newspaper Pravda, intending for it to say "Gorbachev urges disarmament: Total! Unilateral!". Unfortunately, Oliver gets the translation wrong, resulting in the headline being "Gorbachev sings tractors: Turnip! Buttocks!"

Milo appears to be the only staff reporter on the Bloom Beacon. The only other employees seen are the editor-in-chief and Opus, who serves, at various times, as personals editor, editorial writer, ombudsman, and cartoonist (or, as he styles it, "stripper").

He also helps create and manage Bill the Cat's band, Deathtongue, and cofounds with Binkley a political party, The Meadow Party, with Bill and Opus on their presidential ticket.

Post-Bloom County
Milo didn't have an active role in either of Breathed's later syndicated strips. He appeared in Outland only as a background extra on a bus headed far away a week before the feature ended. He appeared in only two frames of the weekly strip Opus, both in the form of visions. The first of these, early on in the strip, was as part of Opus' vision of former "Bloom County" residents he wished to find - Milo, Binkley, Oliver, Steve Dallas, and Bill the Cat. The latter four would all reunite with Opus during the course of the strip, but not Milo. His other appearance was just prior to the strip's conclusion, as part of Steve Dallas' vision of former Bloom County residents (Milo, Binkley, Oliver, Cutter John, Portnoy, and Bill the Cat) waving goodbye as they rode off into the distance atop Cutter John's wheelchair.

Bloom County Revival
Milo returned in the first strip of the 2015 revival of Bloom County, informing Opus that he had been "asleep" for twenty-five years. He continues to play an active role in the comics, though his appearances are relatively minor compared to those of Opus and Bill the Cat.  Milo's Uncle Dewey and his niece Baby Boo have appeared in the strip as well.

References

Bloom, Milo
Bloom, Milo
Bloom, Milo
Bloom, Milo
Bloom, Milo